Roland Barton "Bill" Proud (29 September 1919 – 27 October 1961) was an English first-class cricketer. Proud was a right-handed batsman who bowled right-arm medium pace.

Proud was educated at Winchester College, where he represented the college cricket team. Later, Proud was educated at Oxford University. Proud made his first-class debut for Hampshire against Derbyshire in the 1938 County Championship, playing three first-class matches for the county during the season. In 1939, he made his debut for Oxford University against Yorkshire. Proud represented the university in ten first-class matches in 1939, with his final first-class match for the university coming against Cambridge University. In his ten first-class matches for the university, Proud scored 488 runs at a batting average of 25.68, with four half centuries and a high score of 87. During his freshman year, Proud was awarded his Oxford Blue. Proud continued to represent Hampshire during the 1939 County Championship, playing his final match for the county against Nottinghamshire. In Proud's seven first-class matches for Hampshire, he scored 183 runs at a batting average of 16.63 and a high score of 38*. With the start of the Second World War, County Cricket was suspended until the 1946 season.

After the war Proud joined his native Durham in the Minor Counties Championship, making his debut against Northumberland. In 1947 Proud was made Durham captain, a position he held until his retirement from cricket in 1955. Proud represented Durham 63 times, with his final appearance for the county coming against the Yorkshire Second XI. Additionally, during this period he represented a Minor Counties team against the touring West Indians in a single first-class match in 1950. This was Proud's final first-class match. In his first-class career, Proud scored 681 runs at a batting average of 21.28, with four half centuries and a high score of 87.

Proud died suddenly at Bishop Auckland, County Durham on 27 October 1961. His father, Ernest, also represented Durham and like his son, captained the county.

References

External links

1919 births
1961 deaths
Sportspeople from Bishop Auckland
Cricketers from County Durham
People educated at Winchester College
Alumni of Brasenose College, Oxford
English cricketers
Hampshire cricketers
Oxford University cricketers
Durham cricketers
Durham cricket captains
Minor Counties cricketers